Ooty Racecourse is a highland race course in Ooty, The Nilgiris, Tamil Nadu.  Built for summer racing in the hills, the course stands at an altitude of 2,268 m above sea level. The race course is adjacent to the railway station in the heart of town.
 
In its more than 100 years of remarkable history, the famous Ooty course has witnessed many rare distinctions. "I have been a keen follower of the Ooty racing since the mid-sixties. One of the memorable events the historic course witnessed was M A M Ramaswamy winning the 'Nilgiri Derby' through his ward 'Great Spectacle' thus achieving a double century in the classics, a racing Guinness record, on May 7, 1995," says K Bheeman, a racing enthusiast and Nilgiris resident.
The 1980s saw a tremendous boost — the golden age of Ooty racing — when the racing season would stretch until June. Racing became the lifeline of the Blue Mountains and thousands of summer jobs were linked to the stay of professionals, besides tourism.

Horse races are conducted in the summer season, from April to June, when it has been traditional to come to the hill station to escape the summer heat. The course occupies over 55 acres in the centre of Ooty. The course is about 2.4  km long, and is one of the most famous race courses in India. The main event of the racing season is "The Nilgiri Gold Cup Race", a traditional and popular race. To commemorate 125 years of racing in this hill station, a special race for "The Post Centenary Silver Jubilee Cup" was run in 2011, and creating a garden is under discussion.

A fire occurred at the race course in March 2011, believed to have been started by a cigarette butt, but was put out without harm to the horses.

External links

References 

Tourist attractions in Nilgiris district
Buildings and structures in Ooty
Tourist attractions in Ooty
Culture of Ooty